Rai Ahmad Khan Kharal (– 21 September 1857), widely known as Nawab of Jhamra, was a Punjabi Muslim chieftain of the Kharal tribe. He led rebellion in the Bar region of Punjab against the British East India Company in the War of Independence of 1857 and died fighting against it on 21st of September, 1857, at the age of 81. He is today considered a folk hero in Punjab.

Biography
Rai Ahmad Khan Kharal was born into a rich landowning family of the Kharal clan in the Sandal Bar region of Punjab, in Chak 434 Gb Jhamra village 23 km from Tandlianwala Faisalabad District and 57 km from Faisalabad city.

He was the de facto ruler of Jhamra, he possessed large sum of land and cattle. He was respected by all Kharals as well as other tribes such as Kathia, Wattoo, Fatayana and others. Rai Kharal had influence over all of Sandal Bar.

Lord Berkley (or, in local language, Berkeley), who was the extra Assistant Commissioner of Gogera, called out all important personalities of the area, and Rai Ahmed Khan Kharal came. Berkley demanded all the leaders to supply men and horses to crush the revolt. On this, Rai Ahmed Khan Kharal said "Kharals do not share wife, horse and land with anyone" and left.

Role in War of Independence (1857)
On July 8, British arrested a large number of Joiya tribe's men, women and children after they refused to pay the heavy taxes (Lagan). When Rai Kharal received the news he planned to break into the Gogera jail and rescue the innocent people imprisoned there. With help of his Fatayana, Wattoo and Kathia friends Rai Ahmed attacked the Gogera Jail on July 26. According to British records 17 prisoners were killed, 33 were injured and 18 fled. But native accounts disagree saying 145 prisoners died and 100+ EIC troops were also killed. British arrested Rai Ahmed but released him due to pressure from other tribes and as no proper evidence was available against him. Rai Ahmed Khan Kharal didn't stop and continued rebellion against Britain. In order to arrest Rai Ahmed Khan Kharal, Berkley attached Jhamra but was unable to arrest Rai Kharal although he imprisoned 20 civilians and took with himself a large sum of cattle. Rai Ahmed Khan Kharal with help of Kathia, Wattoo, Fatayana and Joiya tribe started a guerilla campaign against British. According to Punjab government records the rebels numbered 20,000 to 30,000 men. According to John Cave-Browne book each time, these rebels took refuge in thick jungles and grass and attacked with 3000-5000 guerillas, the sound of drum beating was the sign that they would attack. The connection of Jhang to Lahore was completely cut. Rai Ahmed Khan Kharal planned a final attack on Gogera but the information was leaked by Sarfraz Kharal of Kamalia, British were ready to face any attack and when rebels attacked they were repulsed.

Rai Ahmed with his companions fled to Jungles of Gashkori, British got news about it and a force under Captain Black was sent to kill him, they succeeded in killing him while he was offering afternoon prayers. Many of his close companions such as Sarang Khan Kharal of Begeke Kharals also died there. 

A trusted partner of Rai Ahmed Khan Kharal, Murad Fatayana took revenge of him by killing Lord Berkley alongside 50 british and native troops and became Rai's successor leading the rebellion until it ended in 1858 as local tribes lost.

Death
Rai Ahmed Khan Kharal was killed by a force led by Captain Black on September 21 while he was offering afternoon prayers.

See also
Murree rebellion of 1857
 Mai Bakhtawar
 Nizam Lohar
Hemu Kalani
Kadu Makrani
Ajab Khan Afridi
Bhagat Singh
Udham Singh
Kartar Singh Sarabha
Chandrasekhar Azad

References

1770s births
1857 deaths
Punjabi people
Folklore
History of Pakistan
People from Faisalabad
Faisalabad
Faisalabad-related lists
Faisalabad

British East India Company
Military of British India
Mutinies
Conflicts in 1857
1857 Indian Rebellion
1857 in India
Resistance to the British Empire
Indian rebels